This is the discography for Irish folk music singer Damien Rice.

Albums

Studio albums

Live albums

EPs

Singles

Other charted songs

Film and TV contributions
Rice has contributed two songs (Hypnosis and On Children) to the animation motion picture Khalil Gibran's The Prophet in 2015. To the Irish movie Goldfish Memory he contributed cover versions of Waters Of March, Desafinado and Once I Loved with Lisa Hannigan.

Rice's songs have been heard on numerous television shows including So You Think You Can Dance, American Idol, The L Word, True Blood, Hidden Palms, Bones, The Cleaner, Jericho, ER, The Black Donnellys, The OC, Alias, Lost, Huff, Crossing Jordan, Grey's Anatomy, Criminal Minds, House, Spin 1038, CSI: Crime Scene Investigation, The Inbetweeners, One Tree Hill, British television series, Misfits and the Korean drama, Spring Waltz.

Rice's songs have appeared in films such as Goldfish Memory (2003), Reservation Road, Higher Ground, Closer, I am David, Stay, In Good Company, The Girl in the Café, Shrek the Third and Dear Frankie.

His music is referenced in the 2009 novel The Suicide Club by Rhys Thomas, and his songs have been used in professional figure skating competitions.

Collaborations (released)
 "Back to Beginning" with Lamb on 5 (2011)
 "Everything You're Not Supposed To Be" and "Uncomfortable" with Mélanie Laurent on En t'attendant (2011)
 "There Are Debts" with David Hopkins on There Are Debts (2010)
 "Making Noise" with The Cheshire Project on Songs for Tibet: The Art of Peace (2008)
 "To Love Somebody" with Ray Lamontagne on Taratata (2007)
 "The Power of Orange Knickers" with Tori Amos on The Beekeeper (2005)
 "Don't Explain" with Herbie Hancock and Lisa Hannigan (2005)
 Live at the Olympia with Aslan (2005)
 "Skylarkin'" with Mic Christopher (2002)
 "Be Yourself" with Jerry Fish and the Mudbug Club (2002)

References

Country music discographies
Discographies of Irish artists